Gainesway is a neighborhood in southeastern Lexington, Kentucky, United States. Its boundaries are New Circle Road to the north, Tates Creek Road to the west, Armstrong Mill Road to the south, and a combination of Pimlico Parkway and Bold Bidder Drive to the east.

Neighborhood statistics
 Population: 2,014
 Land area: 
 Population density: 4,512 people per square mile
 Median household income: $30,428 (2010)

References

Neighborhoods in Lexington, Kentucky